Borgia Norrköping BK is a bandy club in Norrköping, Sweden, established in 1941. The men's bandy team played in the Swedish top division during the season of 1988-1989.

References

External links
Official website 

1941 establishments in Sweden
Bandy clubs in Sweden
Sport in Norrköping
Bandy clubs established in 1941